Ralph Romano was an ice hockey goaltender, head coach, and athletic director, all with the University of Minnesota–Duluth (UMD).

Career
Ralph Romano spent his entire adult career with the UMD Bulldogs, playing for the team between 1954 and 1956. After graduating he was named as head coach in 1959 and shepherded the team while it transitioned from the MIAC (in what would become a Division III conference) to an upper-classification team and eventually join the dominant conference of the 1960s, the WCHA. Though his teams didn't win many games after it left the MIAC, Romano was well-regarded at the university and was promoted to athletic director in 1969. Romano remained at that position until he died from a heart attack while attending a game against Denver in December 1983. He was posthumously inducted into both the Duluth–Superior Sports Hall of Fame and the Minnesota–Duluth Athletic Hall of Fame.

Head coaching record

References

External links
 

1983 deaths
American ice hockey coaches
Minnesota Duluth Bulldogs athletic directors
Minnesota Duluth Bulldogs men's ice hockey coaches
Minnesota Duluth Bulldogs men's ice hockey players
Ice hockey people from Minnesota
People from Duluth, Minnesota
Ice hockey coaches from Minnesota
Ice hockey people from Duluth, Minnesota
1934 births